Events from the year 1905 in Nigeria

Births 

 Alhaji Aliyu Makama in Bida
 Harcourt Whyte in Abonnema
 Agnes Okoh in Ogba–Egbema–Ndoni
 Fela Sowande in Abeokuta

References 

1900s in Nigeria